Hemiceras is a genus of moths of the family Notodontidae erected by Achille Guenée in 1852.

Species
Hemiceras cadmia Guenée, 1852
Hemiceras tranducta (Walker, [1858])
Hemiceras modesta (Butler, 1879)
Hemiceras sparsipennis Walker, 1857
Hemiceras rufescens (Walker, 1865)
Hemiceras meona (Stoll, [1781])
Hemiceras domingonis Dyar, 1908
Hemiceras walkeri Schaus, 1901
Hemiceras deornata (Walker, 1865)
Hemiceras pallidula Guenée, 1852
Hemiceras trinubila Guenée, 1852
Hemiceras pulverula Guenée, 1852
Hemiceras sigula Guenée, 1852
Hemiceras violascens Guenée, 1852
Hemiceras mora Druce, 1887
Hemiceras alba Walker, 1865
Hemiceras albulana (Druce, 1887)

References

Notodontidae